The SS1 (short for) is the standard assault rifle of the Indonesian armed forces and Indonesian National Police. It is based on the FN FNC rifle but modified in order to meet ergonomic and tropical environment needs.

The assault rifles are gas-operated automatic carbines with a foldable butt and are designed to meet the NATO standard. SS1 weapons are high performance light individual weapons that have been used by the Indonesian armed forces, including the Army, Navy, and Air Force, as well as police. It was adopted into Indonesian service in 1991.

It is currently being phased out and replaced by the Pindad SS2. The SS1 would possibly be used by reserve or paramilitary forces when the SS2 is fully adopted into service.

The SS1 is manufactured by PT Pindad, Bandung, Indonesia under the license from Fabrique Nationale, Belgium.

History
After 10,000 FN FNC rifles were bought for the Indonesian military, Pindad secured a license in 1984 from FN to manufacture the FNC. Indonesia adopted the SS1s into official service by 1991.

A recent seizure of Pindad SS1 rifles alongside P2 pistols in the Philippines has forced politicians to call on a special investigation on Pindad to whether weapon smuggling did take place according to Philippine customs officials. The Indonesian government, in response, has made preparations to form a special agency to handle all overseas trade. The Ministry of State Enterprises has conducted an investigation against Pindad over the seizure of Pindad-made firearms in the Philippines.

Design
The external looks of the SS1s are strongly similar to the FN FNC, ranging from the pistol grip to the stock, receiver and barrel. Optics can be mounted onto the SS1 rifles, but a special optic mount must be installed first before any optic can be used.

The SS1s are designed by Pindad to allow for the use of their own indigenous SPG-1A underbarrel grenade launcher, inserted underneath the barrel. Most SS1 rifle models, with the exception of the SBC-1, are made with selective fire modes that consist of single, three round and full auto firing modes.

Variants

SS1-V1
The V1 is the primary variant, and is most widely used by Indonesian regular infantry forces, with standard barrel and folding stock.

SS1-V2
The short-barreled and compact carbine variant.

SS1-V3
Standard barrel with fixed stock.

SS1-V4
The designated marksman rifle variant similar to SS1-V1 except for the scope to extend the effective range during medium and long range firefights. Intended to be used similar in function to Dragunov Sniper Rifle.

SS1-V5
The smallest variant of SS1 with a 252 mm barrel and 3.37 kg weight with folding stock. Used by engineers, artillery forces, rear-echelon troops and by special forces.

SS1-R5 Raider
Another sub-variant of SS1 V5 called SS1-R5 is designed for mainly special units within the Indonesian Military such as the special infantry Battalion Raiders and other units such as Kostrad or Kopassus. The SS1-R5 is a lighter and slimmer design which doesn't sacrifice high accuracy. Designed for special forces operations such as infiltration, short distance contact in jungle, mountain, marsh, sea and urban warfare. SS1-R5 can be attached with bayonet and various types of telescopes. It has Safe, Single and Full Automatic firing options.

SS1-M1
The modified SS1 intended for the Indonesian Marine Corps. A special coating process ensures the SS1 M series to be able to hold up sea water and not easily rust. The variant is designed to function even after drenched in mud or sand. Available in 3 variants: SS1-M1, with a long barrel and folding stock; SS1-M2, with a short barrel and folding stock and SS1-M5 Commando.

Sabhara/Police V1-V2
A variant created for police use. It's the only rifle in the SS-1 series chambered in 7.62×45mm (a necked-up version of the 5.56×45mm cartridge, utilizing a round-nose bullet similar to the .30 Carbine) created by PT Pindad for law enforcement conditions.

SBC-1
A variant of the SS1-V5 with semi automatic mode only, made specifically for Indonesian customs as the rifle is named "Senapan Bea Cukai" (Indonesian for Customs & Excise Rifle).

Users

 : Exported in 1991.
: Komando Pasukan Katak (Kopaska) tactical diver group and Komando Pasukan Khusus (Kopassus) special forces group. Used by the Indonesian military and police.
 : Purchased 35 SS1 V2 and 35 SS1 V4 assault rifles in 2014.
 : Confiscated by Philippine customs officials when a ship bound to Mali, passing by the Philippines to deliver 10 P2 pistols, was raided after arriving in Philippine waters. The Malian government had ordered 100 SS-1V1 rifles. The rifles were meant to be used by Malian Ministry of Internal Security and Civil Protection. According to Fernandino Tuason of the Customs Intelligence and Investigation Service, he had received credible information that certain politicians were planning to use the weapons, mostly Galils, for destabilization efforts for the presidential elections scheduled to be held in 2010. Pindad officials have explained the misunderstanding since the SS1 rifles are not Galils. The Manila Bulletin has been the only media outlet to check that the Galils are not Galil rifles, but SS1s. In addition, they are presenting evidence that the small arms shipment is legal. It's suggested that a gun-running syndicate is the culprit for getting Indonesian-made weapons to the Philippines. According to further investigation, end user certificates issued by Indonesia were faked.
 
 : Exported in 1992.
Non-state users:
  Free Papua Movement
 
 East Indonesia Mujahideen
 Maute Group

See also 
 Ak 5 - Swedish assault rifle also derived from the FNC.
 Pindad SS2 - Replacement for the SS1.

References

5.56×45mm NATO assault rifles
Carbines
Kalashnikov derivatives
Post–Cold War military equipment of Indonesia
Assault rifles of Indonesia
Military equipment introduced in the 1990s